P. Viswanathan is an Indian politician and incumbent member of the Parliament of India from Kancheepuram Constituency. He represents the Indian National Congress party.

References 

Living people
India MPs 2009–2014
Indian National Congress politicians from Tamil Nadu
Lok Sabha members from Tamil Nadu
People from Kanchipuram district
Year of birth missing (living people)